The 3M Administration Building was the corporate headquarters of 3M in Saint Paul, Minnesota, United States, from 1940 to 1962.  It is listed on the National Register of Historic Places for its national significance in commerce, industry, and invention, and its local significance in architecture.  The building reflects the corporation's success in the 1930s and continued rise to international prominence in the 1940s and 50s through its commitment to research, product development, and product diversification.  The building is also a distinctive example of Moderne architecture within Saint Paul.

See also
 National Register of Historic Places listings in Ramsey County, Minnesota

References

3M
Commercial buildings completed in 1940
Headquarters in the United States
Moderne architecture in Minnesota
National Register of Historic Places in Saint Paul, Minnesota
Office buildings on the National Register of Historic Places in Minnesota
1940 establishments in Minnesota
Office buildings completed in 1940